Nimmala Shankar is an Indian film director, known for his works in Telugu cinema. He is known for directing blockbuster films like Jayam Manade Raa. In 2011, he directed Jai Bolo Telangana, which won five Nandi Awards and was screened at the 6th South Asian Film Festival, held in Goa during September 2011.

Early life
He was born in Nalgonda District, Madgulapally Mandal, Chirumarthy village, Telangana.

Awards
Nandi Awards
Sarojini Devi Award for a Film on National Integration (director) - Jai Bolo Telangana (2011)
Nandi Award for Best Director - Jai Bolo Telangana (2011)

Filmography
Telugu
Encounter     (1997)
Sri Ramulayya (1998)
Yamajathakudu (1999)
Jayam Manade Raa (2000)
Bhadrachalam (2002)
Aayudham (2003)
Raam (2006)
Jai Bolo Telangana (2011)
Two Countries (2017)

Kannada
Nammanna (2005)

References

External links
 
 http://www.idlebrain.com/celeb/interview/nshankar.html

Year of birth missing (living people)
Living people
21st-century Indian film directors
People from Nalgonda
Film directors from Telangana
Nandi Award winners
Telugu film directors
Kannada film directors